Baisley is a surname. Notable people with the surname include: 

Jeff Baisley (born 1982), American baseball player
Mark Baisley (born 1955), American politician

See also
Bailey (surname)
Paisley (name)
Baizley